Halocyaminess are antibiotic peptides isolated from the ascidian Halocynthia roretzi.

Notes

Antibiotics
Peptides